Nilamber and Pitamber, freedom fighters from Jharkhand in eastern India, were brothers who led a revolt against the East India Company in 1857. They were born in a Chemo-Senya village to a family of a Bhogta clan of the Kharwar tribe in Latehar district. Their father, Chemu Singh, was Jagirdar. They decided to declare themselves independent of company rule, inspired by the Doronda Revolt in Ranchi led by Thakur Vishwanath Shahdeo and Pandey Ganpat Rai. Chero Jagirdar Devi Baksh Rai joined them. 

On 21 October, 1857, 500 people, led by Nilamber and Pitamber, attacked Raghubar Dayal, who had sided with the British, at Chainpur. Then they caused heavy destruction at Lesliganj. Lt. Graham was not able to suppress the revolt with only 50 people on his side, and rebels besieged Lt. Graham in the house of Raghubar Dayal. 

In December 1857, two companies under Major Cotter arrived and were able to capture Devi Baksh Rai. To suppress further revolts, Commissioner Dalton arrived in Palamu from Ranchi with Madras Infantry, Ramgarh cavalry and soldiers of the Pithoria Parganait on 21 January, 1858. He and Graham attacked Palamu Fort, which was occupied by rebels. Nilamber and Pitamber were forced to flee due to the strength of British forces. 

Edward Tuite Dalton got Babu Kunwar Singh's letter to Nilambar and Naklait Majhi, who had asked for immediate help. Dalton planned to suppress the rebellion prior to the help of Kunwar Singh. Nilamber and Pitamber continued to fight against the British, by hiding in forests. Eventually they were arrested and hanged on 28 March, 1859 by British forces in Lesliganj.

Commemoration
Nilamber-Pitamber University

See also
Indian Rebellion of 1857

References

Indian independence activists
People from Jharkhand
Revolutionaries of the Indian Rebellion of 1857
1857 in India
1858 in India
India articles needing expert attention